The 2018–19 Jacksonville Dolphins women's basketball team represents Jacksonville University in the 2018–19 NCAA Division I women's basketball season. The Dolphins, led by first year head coach Darnell Haney, play their home games at Swisher Gymnasium and were members of the Atlantic Sun Conference. They finish the season 14–16, 7–9 in A-Sun play finish in sixth place. They lost in the quarterfinals of the 2019 Atlantic Sun women's basketball tournament to Liberty.

Media
All home games and conference road games are shown on ESPN3 or A-Sun.TV.

Roster

Schedule

|-
!colspan=9 style=| Non-conference regular season

|-
!colspan=9 style=| Atlantic Sun regular season

|-
!colspan=9 style=| Atlantic Sun Women's Tournament

Rankings
2018–19 NCAA Division I women's basketball rankings

See also
 2018–19 Jacksonville Dolphins men's basketball team

References

Jacksonville
Jacksonville Dolphins women's basketball seasons